Central Cattle Breeding and Dairy Farm is a Bangladesh government owned cattle breeding farm and research cenre. It is located in Savar Upazila besides Jahangirnagar University. Dr. Mohammad Ali is the Managing Director of the farm.

History
Central Cattle Breeding and Dairy Farm was established in 1959. It start operations in 1964 and was further developed in 1969 with assistance from the German government.

Central Cattle Breeding and Dairy Farm was producing 2000 tones of maize every year.

Embryo transfer protocol was established at the Central Cattle Breeding and Dairy Farm. The government of Bangladesh plans to increase meat and milk production through artificial insemination and breeding local cattle with European breeds. In 2017, Banglanews24.com reported that the farm had kept three secret auction slots for VIP during Eid-ul-Adha sales. The farm admitted underreporting three auction slots but denied it was saved for "VIPs".  

On 28 November 2020, the National Economic Council approved plans to build a grass germplasm nursery in Central Cattle Breeding and Dairy Farm.

References

1959 establishments in East Pakistan
Organisations based in Savar
Research institutes in Bangladesh
Government-owned companies of Bangladesh